Edward Mohamed Turay is a Sierra Leonean politician and diplomat. He was leader of the opposition All People's Congress (APC) from 1996 to 2002. He has been Sierra Leone's High Commissioner to the United Kingdom since 2010.

Background

Education and early years
Turay is from the Temne tribe of northern Sierra Leone and is from Makeni. He is a barrister by profession, having studied law at Manchester University, and been called to the bar at Lincoln's Inn in 1976. Returning to Sierra Leone in 1979, he was a magistrate for three years before engaging in politics in 1982. He is the founder and consultant of Eddie Turay & Associates, a leading law firm in Freetown, Sierra Leone.

Political career
In 1986 Turay won a seat as a Member of Parliament for Bombali Central one Constituency. He was re-elected to parliament from Bombali District's Constituency 33 in the August 2007 parliamentary election, receiving 73.2% of the vote.

He was leader of the  All People's Congress (APC) from 1996 until 2002. He contested the 1996 national election for president, but lost the election after gaining just 5.1% of the first round of voting, good enough for fifth place. He was then Minority Leader of the House of Parliament from 1996 to 2002. Ernest Bai Koroma since took over as parliamentary leader and presidential candidate of the APC, beginning in 2002. On September 25, 2007, when the members of parliament were sworn in, Turay was appointed as leader of the Majority Party, in which position he was also Leader of Government Business.

In January 2010, Turay was appointed Sierra Leone's High Commissioner to the United Kingdom of Great Britain and Northern Ireland, accredited to eight other states: Cyprus, Ireland, Spain, Portugal, Norway, Denmark, Sweden and Greece.

In May 2014, Turay was awarded the Grassroot Diplomat Initiative Award under the Business Driver category for his extensive work on galvanising diaspora communities across Europe, bringing better visibility to his country and people.

Writing
Turay is the author of an autobiographical book entitled The Prophecies of a Father (AuthorHouse, 2013), which "revolves around the traditional beliefs and faith of his late father, Paramount Chief Kande Turay of Sanda Chiefdom. Turay’s father comes to represent a benevolence and acceptance of integrating Western beliefs and education with traditional African beliefs."

References

External links
 Turay's 1998 testimony in front of the US Congress on the conflict in Sierra Leone.
 "Interview with H.E. Edward M. Turay, Sierra Leone, High Commissioner, UK and Northern Ireland", YouTube.

Living people
Year of birth missing (living people)
20th-century Sierra Leonean judges
Members of the Parliament of Sierra Leone
High Commissioners of Sierra Leone to the United Kingdom
Temne people
All People's Congress politicians
People from Makeni